This is a list of notable YMCA buildings.  Buildings for YMCA use are prominent in many cities and towns.

Canada 
Birks Building (1901), in North Bay, Ontario, listed on Canadian Register of Historic Places in 2004 
Shane Homes YMCA at Rocky Ridge (2018), in Calgary, Alberta, owned by city of Calgary

Hong Kong 
YMCA of Hong Kong at 22 Salisbury road, Tsim Sha Tsui since 1922. In 1996, YMCA of Hong Kong established the College of Continuing Education.

India 
 YMCA Institute of Engineering, an educational institution in Faridabad, India.

Israel
Jerusalem International YMCA (1933)

Singapore
 Old YMCA Building, demolished in 1981, a new YMCA Building was rebuilt on its former site.
 YMCA Building

United Kingdom 
 Indian Students' Union and Hostel in Central London.

United States 
(by city, then state/territory):

Arizona 
 El Paso and Southwestern Railroad YMCA, Douglas, Arizona, listed on the NRHP in Cochise County, Arizona.

Arkansas 
 YMCA-Democrat Building, Little Rock, Arkansas, listed on the NRHP in Little Rock, Arkansas.
 Little Rock YMCA, Little Rock, Arkansas, listed on the NRHP in Little Rock, Arkansas.

California 
 Pomona YMCA Building, Pomona, California, listed on the NRHP in Los Angeles County, California.
 YMCA building (Riverside, California).
 San Diego Armed Services YMCA, San Diego, California, listed on the NRHP in California.
 YMCA Hotel (San Francisco, California), listed on the National Register of Historic Places in San Francisco, California.

Colorado 
 Downtown Denver Central YMCA and Annex, Denver, Colorado, listed on the NRHP in Colorado.

Connecticut 
 Greenwich YMCA, Greenwich, Connecticut, listed on the NRHP in Connecticut.

Delaware 
 Wilmington YMCA (Wilmington, Delaware), listed on the NRHP in Delaware.

District of Columbia 
 Anthony Bowen YMCA, Washington, D.C., listed on the NRHP in Washington, D.C.

Georgia 
 YMCA (Columbus, Georgia), listed on the NRHP in Georgia.

Illinois 
 Wabash Avenue YMCA, Chicago, Illinois, listed on the NRHP in Illinois.
 YMCA Hotel, listed on the National Register of Historic Places in Cook County, Illinois.
 Joliet YMCA, Joliet, Illinois, listed on the NRHP in Illinois.
Kroehler YMCA, Naperville, IL

Indiana 
 YMCA (Evansville, Indiana), NRHP-listed

Iowa 
 YMCA Building (Council Bluffs, Iowa), listed on the National Register of Historic Places in Pottawattamie County, Iowa.
 Dubuque YMCA Building, Dubuque, Iowa, listed on the NRHP in Iowa.
 Mason City YMCA, Mason City, Iowa, listed on the NRHP in Iowa.
 YMCA Building (Waterloo, Iowa), listed on the National Register of Historic Places in Black Hawk County, Iowa.

Kansas 
 Scottish Rite Temple (Wichita, Kansas), NRHP-listed, known also as "YMCA Building".

Kentucky 
 YMCA Building (Louisville, Kentucky), listed on the National Register of Historic Places in Jefferson County, Kentucky.
 Knights of Pythias Temple (Louisville, Kentucky), also known as "Chestnut Street Branch-YMCA", NRHP-listed.
 Russell Railroad YMCA, Russell, Kentucky, listed on the NRHP in Kentucky.

Louisiana 
 YMCA, Downtown Branch. Shreveport, Louisiana, listed on the NRHP in Louisiana.

Maryland 
 Baltimore, Maryland, Oldest Central Building of the YMCA constructed 1872–73, a triangular structure of five stories in "Second Empire" style architecture with brick and stone trim, slate mansard roof with large corner central tower and several smaller towers (later removed in early 1900s remodeling), at the northwest corner of West Saratoga and North Charles Street, on the northwest edge of downtown Baltimore. Former historic site of the first Roman Catholic Parish (1770) and Pro-Cathedral of St. Peter's in the new Diocese of Baltimore, which is the first established ("erected") diocese in America with first bishop John Carroll in 1789-90 (built of simple red brick, in Georgian/Federal style with attached rectory and surrounding cemetery), and served as America's first Cathedral until 1821 when the new Baltimore Cathedral designed by Latrobe, several blocks north was dedicated.  Designed by famed local architects Neilson and Niernsee, just a few blocks east from where the local YMCA was first established in Baltimore in the 1850s.  Old Central YMCA was across Charles Street from the first church in the city and metropolitan area, Old St. Paul's Anglican (Episcopal) Church, founded 1692 in southeastern Baltimore County and later relocated to the southeast corner of Charles and Saratoga when Baltimore Town was first laid out in 1729–30. The Old 19th Century YMCA was later converted into offices in the 1920s when the Association moved several blocks north to West Franklin Street on "Cathedral Hill". On the northeastern edge of the massive downtown "urban renewal" project of "Charles Center" from 1958 to the middle 1970s, spared this unique structure although two elaborate marble/granite banks across West Saratoga Street to the southwest were demolished to be replaced by two twin apartment skyscraper towers and "Charles Plaza", with a movie theatre and commercial shops.  Additional interior restoration/renovation on the building was done in the early 1980s and again in 2013 when it was converted into apartments/condos.
 Cumberland YMCA, Cumberland, Maryland, listed on the NRHP in Maryland (C. William Gilchrist Center).

Massachusetts  
 YMCA (Salem, Massachusetts), listed on the NRHP in Massachusetts.

Michigan 
 Muskegon YMCA Building, Muskegon, Michigan, listed on the NRHP in Michigan.

Minnesota
 Minneapolis YMCA Central Building, Minneapolis, Minnesota, a 12-story skyscraper building in downtown Minneapolis, Minnesota built in 1919.  It was built in the Late "Gothic Revival" style of architecture, making it stand out from other buildings.  The Gothic styling was chosen to emphasize the vertical mass of the structure and to make it appear as a powerful corporate symbol.  The styling also brought a symbolic association with church architecture, making it fit into the YMCA's value system.

Mississippi
 YMCA Building (Oxford, Mississippi), a Mississippi Landmark.
 YMCA Building (Starkville, Mississippi), a Mississippi Landmark.

Missouri
 Paseo YMCA, Kansas City, Missouri,  listed on the NRHP in Missouri.
 Principia Page-Park YMCA Gymnasium, St. Louis, Missouri, listed on the NRHP in Missouri.

Montana
 Bozeman YMCA, Bozeman, Montana, listed on the NRHP in Montana.
 YMCA Building (Great Falls, Montana), listed on the National Register of Historic Places in Cascade County, Montana.

Nebraska
 McCook YMCA, McCook, Nebraska, listed on the NRHP in Nebraska.

New Jersey
 Jersey City YMCA, Jersey City, New Jersey, listed on the NRHP in New Jersey.
Wayne YMCA, now part of the Metro YMCA of the Oranges, was originally a YM-YWHA (Young Men-Young Women Hebrew Association) chapter. This shows how congregations can come together around shared community goals beyond religious denominations.

New Mexico
YMCA building (1907), designed by Trost & Trost, on New Mexico State University campus.  Listed on the National Register as Air Science.

New York
 YMCA Building (Albany, New York), listed on the National Register of Historic Places in Albany, New York.
 YMCA Central Building (Buffalo, New York), Buffalo, New York, listed on the NRHP in Erie County, New York.
 Sloane House YMCA, West 34th Street, New York City, which was the largest residential YMCA in the U.S.A.
 Old Poughkeepsie YMCA, Poughkeepsie, New York, listed on the NRHP as "Young Men's Christian Association".
 United States Post Office (Canandaigua, New York), now used by the YMCA and listed on the NRHP in Ontario County, New York.

North Carolina
 Spruce Street YMCA, Winston-Salem, North Carolina, listed on the NRHP in North Carolina.
 Harris YMCA, Charlotte, North Carolina, listed on the NRHP in North Carolina.

Ohio

 Akron YMCA Building, Akron, Ohio, listed on the NRHP in Ohio.
 Brewster Railroad YMCA/Wandle House, Brewster, Ohio, listed on the NRHP in Ohio.
 YMCA Building, Columbus, Ohio, listed on the NRHP in Ohio.
 Central YMCA (Cleveland, Ohio), listed on the NRHP in Ohio.
 YMCA (East Liverpool, Ohio), NRHP-listed, Classical Revival architecture.
 Lorain YMCA Building, Lorain, Ohio, listed on the NRHP in Ohio.
 Steubenville YMCA Building, Steubenville, Ohio, listed on the NRHP in Ohio.
 Central YMCA (Toledo, Ohio), listed on the NRHP in Ohio.
 Zanesville YMCA, Zanesville, Ohio, listed on the NRHP in Ohio.

Oregon
 Sellwood Branch YMCA, Portland, Oregon, listed on the NRHP in Oregon.

Pennsylvania
 Thomas Beaver Free Library and Danville YMCA, Danville, Pennsylvania, listed on the NRHP in Pennsylvania.
 YMCA Philadelphia, Philadelphia, Pennsylvania, listed on the NRHP as "Young Men's Christian Association", is a building in the "Art Deco" style of architecture, designed by Louis E. Jallade and built 1926 to 1928. It has since been converted into condominiums.

Puerto Rico
 Ponce YMCA Building, Ponce, Puerto Rico, listed on the NRHP in Ponce.

Rhode Island
 Army and Navy YMCA, Newport, Rhode Island, listed on the NRHP in Rhode Island.

Tennessee
 Knoxville YMCA Building, Knoxville, Tennessee, listed on the NRHP in Tennessee.
 Leslie M. Stratton YMCA, Memphis, Tennessee, listed on the NRHP in Tennessee.

Texas
 Beaumont YMCA, Beaumont, Texas, listed on the NRHP in Texas.

Washington
 YMCA Building (Tacoma, Washington), listed on the National Register of Historic Places in Pierce County, Washington.

West Virginia

YMCA May Building (Huntington, West Virginia), either of two buildings of the Huntington YMCA, founded 1895, in downtown Huntington:
its first dedicated building, constructed 1931, relinquished later, in use by Huntington hospice in 2022
its third building, in YMCA use for swimming, racquetball, and more in 2022. It was renovated in 2011 for $500,000.

Wisconsin
 Baasen House-German YMCA, Milwaukee, Wisconsin, listed on the NRHP in Wisconsin.
 YMCA Building (Racine, Wisconsin), listed on the National Register of Historic Places in Racine County, Wisconsin.

See also

List of YWCA buildings
92nd Street Y (92nd Street Young Men's and Young Women's Hebrew Association [YM-YWHA], New York City)
Young Men's and Young Women's Hebrew Association Building, Baltimore, Maryland

References

Lists of buildings and structures